The Lake Saka Nature Reserve is a nature reserve at Sivriler village of Demirköy district in Kırklareli Province of Turkey close to İğneada on the Black Sea coast. It gets its name from the Lake Saka, which is in the boundaries of the İğneada Floodplain Forests National Park.

The sits is on a floodplain of a river that flows into the Black Sea, and seasonally floods thus rendering it a unique and one of the very few remaining floodplain forests in all of Europe.

Flora
In addition to the main flora of alder (Alnus), elm (Ulmus) and ash (Fraxinus), trees such as oak (Quercus), hornbeam (Carpinus), beech (Fagaceae), black poplar (Populus nigra), white poplar (Populus alba), willow (Salix), linden (Tilia) and walnut (Juglans) are found in the nature reserve.

Fauna
The fauna of the protected area consists of the mammals: deer (Cervidae), roe deer (Capreolus capreolus), fox (Canidae), gray wolf ((Canis lupus), hare (Lepus), wild boar (Sus scrofa), wildcat  (Felis silvestris) and the birds swan (Cygnus), mallard (Anas platyrhynchos), greylag goose (Anser anser), woodcock (Scolopax) and common wood pigeon (Columba palumbus). The nature reserve is habitat for the reptiles such as viper (Viperidae), slow-worm (Anguis fragilis) and water snake. The lake is home to the fish species of carp (Cyprinidae), red seabream, bass (Perciformes) as well as to crustaceans like crayfish.

References

External links
About (in Turkish)

Nature reserves in Turkey
Saka
Geography of Kırklareli Province
Demirköy District
Tourist attractions in Kırklareli Province